Men and boys are more frequently diagnosed with autism than women and girls. It is debated whether this is due to a sex difference in rates of autism spectrum disorders (ASD) or whether females are underdiagnosed. The prevalence ratio is often cited as about 4 males for every 1 female diagnosed. Other research indicates that it closer to 3:1 or 2:1. One in every 42 males and one in 189 females in the United States is diagnosed with autism spectrum disorder. There is some evidence that females may also receive diagnoses somewhat later than males; however, thus far results have been contradictory.

Several theories exist to explain the sex-based discrepancy, such as a genetic protective effect, the extreme male brain theory and phenotypic differences in the presentation between sexes, which may all be intertwined. Researchers have also debated whether a diagnostic gender bias has played a role in females being underdiagnosed with autism spectrum disorder. Researchers have also speculated a gender bias in parental reporting due to the expectations and socialization of gender roles in society.

Since autism is a largely genetic and hereditary condition, genetic factors that lead to differences depending on sex come into play, such as the role of androgen signaling in male development or X-linked mutations, whose associated genetic conditions are typically more common and severe in males. The extreme male brain theory suggests that autistic brains show an exaggeration of the features associated with male brains, such as increased size and decreased relative connectivity as well as systematic thinking over empathetic thinking. The imprinted brain hypothesis suggests genomic imprinting is at least partly responsible for the sex differences in autism and points to the evidence for a common genetic cause with schizophrenia.

Compared to men, women are generally required to be more impaired by their autism or have more cognitive or behavioral conditions than their male counterparts to meet autism spectrum criteria. There is evidence of increased incidence of social anxiety, anorexia nervosa and self-harm in autistic females, though the increased rates of anorexia nervosa and other eating disorders may be due to confusion or conflation with avoidant/restrictive food intake disorder (ARFID), which is particularly common in autism.
Autistic girls and women show higher social motivation and a greater capacity for typical friendships than autistic boys and men, are less likely to be hyperactive, impulsive, have issues with conduct or stereotyped behavioral traits, and have been shown to mask their conditions more frequently than autistic men. Autistic males often exhibit more easily observed behaviors at a younger age resulting in parental observance and subsequent evaluation of the child. In contrast, behavior of young females is more often overlooked, regardless of any associated at-risk factors for ASD or other developmental delays. Ultimately, this may contribute to females more frequently receiving their ASD diagnosis later in life than their male counterpart. There is a growing consensus among neuroscientists that the number of autistic women has been vastly underrepresented due to the assumption that it is primarily a male condition.

Background 

Hans Asperger was one of the first people to study autism, with all of his four study subjects being male. Another early researcher, Leo Kanner described "autistic disturbances of affective contact" in the group consisting of eight boys and three girls.

Today, Autism Spectrum Disorder is commonly defined as a neurological developmental disorder with symptoms of poor social communication, repetitive behaviors, sensory sensitivities, executive dysfunction, and hyper-fixations. In the modern day, women are less likely to be diagnosed as autistic than men; they are often misdiagnosed or not noticed to be neurodivergent by doctors. Women are also more likely to be diagnosed as autistic at a later age than men. This discrepancy in diagnoses is believed to be caused by Camouflaging, a common autistic phenotype presented in females, which hides autistic traits.

Theories explaining gender diagnosis disparity

Extreme male brain theory

Extreme Male Brain Theory is an extension of the Empathizing-Systemizing Theory, which categorizes people into 5 different groups based on their empathizing and systemizing expressions. In the general neurotypical population, females have a greater ability to empathize, and males have a greater ability to systemize. Simon Baron-Cohen's extreme male brain theory states that autistic males have higher doses of prenatal testosterone and on average have a more systemizing brain, as opposed to the more empathizing female brain. He suggests that autistic brains show an exaggeration of the features associated with male brains. These are mainly size and connectivity, with males generally having a larger brain, which is seen in an exaggerated form in those with ASD. Individuals with ASD were found to have widespread abnormalities in interconnectivity and general functioning in specific brain regions. This could explain the different results on empathy tests between men and women as well as the deficiencies in empathy seen in ASD, as empathy requires several brain regions to be activated which need information from many different areas of the brain. Baron-Cohen therefore argues that genetic factors play a role in autism prevalence and that children with technically minded parents are more likely to be diagnosed with autism. Although autistic females have been documented to have higher testosterone levels, which could support the Extreme Male Brain theory, not all autistic females show male-specific symptoms, leaving the Extreme Male Brain theory with Autism Spectrum Disorder to be controversial.

Imprinted brain hypothesis 

The imprinted brain theory suggests genomic imprinting is at least partly responsible for the sex differences in autism and implicates schizophrenia as well, claiming that genetic and physiological evidence suggests the two conditions are on a spectrum in which some mutations in certain genes cause lower social cognition but higher practical cognition (autism) while other mutations in the same genes cause lower practical cognition with higher social cognition (schizophrenia).

Female protective effect hypothesis
According to the female protective effect hypothesis, more extreme genetic mutations are required for a girl to develop autism than for a boy. In 2012, Harvard researchers published findings suggesting that, on average, more genetic and environmental risk factors are required for girls to develop autism, compared to boys. The researchers analyzed DNA samples of nearly 800 families affected by autism and nearly 16,000 individuals with a variety of neurodevelopmental disorders. They looked for various types of gene mutations. Overall, they found that females diagnosed with autism or another neurodevelopmental disorder had a greater number of harmful mutations throughout the genome than did males with the same disorders. Women with an extra X chromosome, 47,XXX or triple X syndrome, have autism-like social impairments in 32% of cases.

Hypothesis of female under-diagnosis 
The prevalence ratio is often cited as about 4 males for every 1 female diagnosed. Other research indicates that it closer to 3:1 or 2:1.

Some authors, clinicians and experts like Judith Gould, Tony Attwood, Lorna Wing and Christopher Gillberg have proposed that autism in females may be underdiagnosed due to better natural superficial social mimicry skills in females, partially different set of symptoms and less knowledge about autism in females among experts. In his preword to the book Asperger's and Girls, Attwood writes: "These tentative explanations for the apparent underrepresentation of girls with Asperger's Syndrome have yet to be examined by objective research studies."

Specifically, Gould has discussed the idea that a pervasive developmental disorder called pathological demand avoidance, which is not officially included in diagnostic manuals, may offer a glimpse into how autism in females may present in some cases.

Another clinician, William Mandy, hypothesized referrals for ASD assessment are often started by teachers. Girls with ASD may sometimes lack the skills of social communication and this is not noticed until they are in a school setting. Therefore, girls suggested to have ASD may receive delayed or no clinical assessment. Compared with males, females with autism are more likely to mask their restricted interests (strong or intense interests in specific topics or objects), which could decrease the chances of diagnosis.

Female phenotype
Some have suggested a differential phenotype for autistic women; "a female-specific manifestation of autistic strengths and difficulties, which fits imperfectly with current, male-based conceptualisations" of autism. One study found evidence for a diagnostic bias against girls who meet criteria for ASD. In some cases where females showed severe autistic traits, they failed to meet the criteria for a diagnosis, because of the lack of sensitivity to the female phenotype.

Camouflaging 
The DSM-5 mainly looks at two categories of autism spectrum symptoms when diagnosing someone: social deficits and restricted/repetitive behaviors and interests. Both of these categories of symptoms can be hidden by an aspect of the autistic female phenotype known as Camouflaging.

Autistic girls tend to camouflage more than boys, this leads to many of their symptoms being hidden and not noticed by professionals. When it comes to social camouflaging, there are three sub-categories according to the Camouflaging Autistic Traits Questionnaire (CAT-Q): Masking, Assimilation, and Compensation. Masking is the act of constantly monitoring one's behavior in order to hide one's autistic traits and/or putting on a fake persona. Assimilation is known as "hiding in plain sight" or trying to blend in with non-autistic peers. Finally, compensation is trying to over-compensate for a lack of social abilities. Examples of this can include mimicking real or fictional people, over exaggerating non-verbal expressions, and creating scripts or rules when having a conversion with someone.

Camouflaging can also be used to hide repetitive/restricted behaviors and interests. In fact, researchers have found that autistic girls are ten times more likely to not originally meet the DSM-5 criteria for restricted/repetitive behaviors. Sensory overstimulation is another autistic trait that can be hidden by masking. Participants of the Hull, et al, would internalize their overwhelming feelings and try to channel it through small and unnoticeable everyday objects. If those objects were not enough to calm them down, then they would try to leave the environment and recuperate by making “ regular excuses'' as to why they needed to leave.

Downfalls of camouflaging 
Studies have shown that high levels of camouflaging is can lead to higher levels of anxiety and depression and can increase the risk of suicidal ideation. Studies have also found that camouflaging can lead to a skewed sense of self. This is especially the case for people who had been masking and mimicking other people for long periods of time. Another factor of masking is mental and physical exhaustion after a camouflaging session. According to the participants of the Hull, et al (2017) study, the longer that autistic individuals camouflage, the worse the exhaustion becomes and the longer these individuals need to rest and recharge. This study had also found that there were increased amounts of anxiety and stress revolving around camouflaging because the participants were often worried that they did not mask enough, did not mask correctly, or did not reach the desired effects of masking in that camouflaging session. Another one of the factors that increased anxiety and exhaustion while camouflaging is the fact that it “involved a constant monitoring of the situation, as if training oneself in self-monitoring, self-awareness, and monitoring others’ reactions, both during and after the interaction occurred."

Differences in gender and sexuality identification

Sexuality is often discussed within the autistic community, with many observations that identities other than cis-hetero seem to be more common than is observed in the neurotypical population. There have not been many formal studies on this to date, however members of the community speculate that autistic individuals generally have different ideals, perceptions and desires than neurotypicals or simply do not comprehend or agree with society's expectation, making them more apt to diverge from the norm.

A study looking at the co-occurrence of ASD in patients with gender dysphoria found 7.8% of patients to be on the autism spectrum. Another study consisting of online surveys that included those who identified as nonbinary and those identifying as transgender without diagnoses of gender dysphoria found the number to be as high as 24% of gender diverse people having autism, versus around 5% of the surveyed cisgender people. A possible hypothesis for the correlation may be that autistic people are less able to conform to societal norms, which may explain the high number of autistic individuals who identify outside the stereotypical gender binary. As of yet, there have been no studies specifically addressing the occurrence of autism in intersex individuals.

A study conducted by Byers and Nichols (2014) explored the level of sexual satisfaction of high-functioning autistic individuals, with researchers testing the sexual and relationship satisfaction of neurotypical versus high functioning autistic individuals. The results suggest that men with ASD are generally less satisfied with their relationship or marriage compared to neurotypical men and women, and women with ASD.

See also
Epidemiology of autism
Gender bias in psychological diagnosis
Mental disorders and gender
Sex differences in schizophrenia
Autism Diagnostic Interview

References

Autism
Autism